Sayyid Fazlollah Mousavi is an Iranian conservative jurist and politician, who was the former jurist member of the Guardian Council from 2016 to 2022. 

He served a member of the Parliament of Iran from 2004 to 2008 representing Tehran, Rey, Shemiranat and Eslamshahr.

References

External links 
 Homepage

1953 births
Living people
Members of the 7th Islamic Consultative Assembly
Deputies of Tehran, Rey, Shemiranat and Eslamshahr
Alliance of Builders of Islamic Iran politicians
Members of the Guardian Council